HSE University, officially the National Research University Higher School of Economics is a public research university founded in 1992 and headquartered in Moscow, Russia. Along with its main campus located in the capital, the university maintains three other regional campuses in Nizhny Novgorod, Perm and Saint Petersburg. There is also the Lyceum at the National Research University Higher School of Economics in Moscow.

Widely regarded among the most prestigious universities in Russia and the CIS, it acquired the status of "national research university" in 2009. HSE was the first educational institution in Russia to successfully introduce Bachelor's and Master's degrees, having also taken part in the development and implementation of the Unified State Exam to modernize education and health care systems of Russia.

Starting from 2013, HSE University has also participated in the Project 5-100 (the project was initiated by the Ministry of Education and Science to promote at least five Russian universities to the top 100 universities according to Times Higher Education World University Rankings, QS World University Rankings, and Academic Ranking of World Universities). In 2022 it was ranked #568 in Best Global Universities by U.S. News & World Report, and #881 by Center for World University Rankings, and in 2020 it was ranked in the #801-900 group in the Academic Ranking of World Universities (ARWU), also known as the Shanghai Ranking.

HSE offers education at all levels – from a lyceum for school students to post-graduate and MBA programmes. Students can pursue training in a number of fields, including the social sciences, economics, humanities, law, engineering, computer science, mathematics, physics, chemistry, biology and biotechnology, as well as in creative disciplines. HSE is the only university in Russia that is ranked in top 100 of the Times Higher Education Young University Rankings. Furthermore, university representatives are part of the Civic Chamber of the Russian Federation and the Expert Council under the Government of Russia.

Administration

HSE University was established on 27 November 1992 by a decree from the Russian government. Since then, the university has been administered by a permanent rector Yaroslav Kuzminov who also participated in the founding of the university.

In July 2021, Yaroslav Kuzminov resigned.  became the new rector. Kuzminov was elected to the post of Academic Supervisor, which Yevgeny Yasin left for health reasons.

Prior to that, former Minister of Economics Yevgeny Yasin held the position of Academic Supervisor and represented the university in other academic organizations, while the university President Alexander Shokhin represented it in its interactions with governmental bodies.

Members of various university councils include Russian politician Sergey Kiriyenko, Chairman of the State Duma Vyacheslav Volodin, the founder of "Sberbank" Herman Gref, the president of Renova Group Viktor Vekselberg, Russian billionaire technology entrepreneur Arkady Volozh, Chairman of the management board of Otkritie FC Bank Mikhail Mikhailovich Zadornov, a major shareholder of the Russian gas company Novatek Leonid Mikhelson, philanthropist Vadim Moshkovich, as well as the businessman and political activist Mikhail Prokhorov.

History

Prerequisites for establishment
At the beginning of the 1990s, the state of education in the fields of economics and social science was poorly developed in Russian universities. One of the main causes of this state of affairs was the legacy of the communist system, a system that had led to the exile of many intellectuals, the absence of which would later end up limiting advancement in several academic fields of research. The transition from a centrally based economy to a market economy started in the USSR in the 1980s. Consequently, in 1992, Gaidar's government initiated a number of  that drastically increased the need for specialists familiar with the contemporary world economy to conduct analysis and run predictions. In 1992, the government enacted a law authorizing the creation of private universities. At that time, in Russia, 33 state universities specialized in sociology and economy. Reforming the existing conservative universities, including the Moscow State University, seemed like an ineffective solution. Thus, the government approved the idea to establish a new university with research priorities in socio-economic sciences.

Establishment and formation 

In many ways, HSE University was founded by the efforts of Yaroslav Kuzminov and Yevgeny Yasin. By the beginning of the 1990s, both of them taught economics at the Moscow State University wherein 1989 Kuzminov founded "alternative" (or non-communist) Department of Economics sponsored by the Soros Foundation. The proposed project was drawn up for 100 million euro that aimed to provide "technical assistance in the field of economic education". The proposed project included about 30 projects, including the Gaidar Institute for Economic Policy.

On 27 November 1992, Gaidar signed the government decree "On creation of the Higher School of Economics" (it was his last decree as the Deputy Prime Minister of the Russian Federation). HSE founders noted that they intentionally avoided the term "university" and instead choose "school" referring to the London School of Economics. The European Union and the Government of France immediately sponsored the project. Therefore, HSE University sent its scholars to study in the Netherlands and invited professors from the Sorbonne University and Erasmus Programme.

The missing library was offset by a rapidly created online resource system with training materials. Since the university deliberately avoided state education programs, it focused on translation of advanced foreign textbooks which formed the basis of education programs. University experts consulted with the government on socio-economic reforms, jurisprudence, and political science. For example, at the beginning of the 2000s, Kuzminov and Yasin participated in the creation of the "" – social and economic development program initiated by German Gref and aimed at forming foundation for government policy.

Education system; rankings 
In 2022 it was ranked #568 in Best Global Universities by U.S. News & World Report, and #881 by Center for World University Rankings, and in 2020 it was ranked in the #801-900 group in the Academic Ranking of World Universities (ARWU), also known as the Shanghai Ranking.

In September 1993, HSE University became the first university that introduced the Bologna education system in Russia. Thus, when Russia joined the Bologna Process in 1998, the Higher School of Economics already had certified graduates from the program – the first Master's graduation happened in 1995, while the Bachelor's took place the next year.

In 1997, HSE University and the London School of Economics (LSE) signed the agreement on establishing The International College of Economics and Finance (ICEF), that was later renamed to "International Institute of Economics and Finance". According to the regulations of the University of London, starting from the second year, students take classes in English. Upon the successful completion of requirements, they receive a double diploma issued by the University of London and the Higher School of Economics.

In 2001, the Ministry of Education initiated the project of the Unified State Exam (USE) which was developed together with the specialists from HSE. The USE is a series of exams that students must pass after graduating from school to apply to a university or professional college. Since 2009, the USE is the only form of graduation examination in schools. HSE was the first university in Russia to accept USE results as a main criteria for students enrolling. Thus, the university was able to set a high threshold and admit the most talented students from all over Russia.

In 2004, the first Academic Foundation was established to support university research and promote academic activities. A year later a group of research laboratories was opened and in 2006 HSE launched the Center for Fundamental Research to coordinate university research including government orders. The first international laboratories affiliated with the university were launched in 2010–2011.

By the beginning of the 2000s, universities in Russia were deprived of full state support and were forced to attract funds and investors on their own. At that time, HSE was already an influential think tank with more than 20% of its income earned by performing custom research. Besides the USE, HSE experts worked on administrative reforms and on  "The Digital Russia Program". In August 2008, HSE University became directly subordinated to the Russian government with which it was working closely for the previous five years. Under the instructions of the President, the university initiated the development of the "Strategy 2020" program.

Recent years
Starting from the 2010s, the Ministry of Education initiated the process of university mergers. Consequently, the Moscow Institute of Electronics and Mathematics was included into the administrative structure of the Higher School of Economics. Additionally in 2011, the HSE Lyceum was founded for high school students. The university would go on to open several more faculties, including: The Faculty of Communication, Media, and Design, Philology, and in 2014 (with support of the Yandex group) – the Faculty of Computer Science. The first admission to the Faculty of Physics took place in 2017. In 2018, the university opened the faculties of Chemistry, Biology and Biotechnology.

In recent years (2019–2020) the heads of various faculties in agreement with each other decided to start the company of renaming their faculties. The corresponding decision was made by the HSE Academic Council as part of the HSE development programs for 2030, aimed at further increasing the university's global competitiveness.

The main reason for doing so is that originally HSE was primarily focused on Economic studies, but with constant rapid development a lot of new branches appeared. Thus, instead of Higher School of Economics Faculty of Management it will be named "Higher School of Business".

In 2010, a bronze bust of Yegor Gaidar was put up by private donations of the faculty in the university building .

In 2018, the rector of Higher School of Economics, Yaroslav Kuzminov, announced that all lectures will switch to on-line format in 2020s Kuzminov claims that traditional classes are ineffective - they are visited by only 15-17% of students. Instead of them, professeurs will create their own distant courses and interact with the audience in the distant format. The university believes, that this measure will help to increase the engagement of students into the education process.

Despite actively working for the government on various projects, the university had, until recently, positioned itself as a politically independent actor. Consequently, there have been incidents in the history of the university that caused public outcry. For instance, during the anti-government protests of 2009, many university students and lecturers attended rallies. After that, the HSE administration received a request from the Moscow police to expel students and to fire professors that took part in anti-government activities. However, the university refused to take the requested action elaborating on its decision with the phrase: “they [students and professors] are not forbidden from participating in politics".

Representatives of the Ministry of Economic Development were also present at the event.

In 2018–20, there were several incidents related to the "V Tochku" university talk show. For instance, after the press secretary for the President of Russia Dmitry Peskov gave a talk at the show discussing Navalny and some aspects of contemporary Russian state discourse, the recording of the speech was not published on the website as it usually happened with other talks. However, its full transcription was published on the BBC website. The Department of Media and Communications apologized to students who publicly protested against the case, calling it a manifestation of censorship.

In the recent years, the HSE has tried to distance itself from any political affiliations which was especially evident in the case of Yegor Zhukov, who was sentenced to three years of probation for unauthorized rioting against corruption among Moscow authorities.

Nikita Yuryevich Anisimov, Rector of the university, was suspended by the European University Association (EUA) following support for the 2022 Russian invasion of Ukraine by the Russian Union of Rectors (RUR) in March 2022, for being "diametrically opposed to the European values that they committed to when joining EUA”. In response to the Russian invasion, in March 2022 the Hamburg University of Applied Sciences, the Fletcher School at Tufts University, School of Slavonic and East European Studies at UCL, and Australian National University suspended their relationships with the university.

Campuses

Nizhny Novgorod 
The first regional campus was opened in Nizhny Novgorod in 1996. As of 2018, the campus had a population of 2700 students and 320 faculty. In terms of quality of budgetary admission, it ranks first among the universities in Nizhny Novgorod and takes the 19th position in the Russian ratings on the quality of education.

Saint Petersburg 
The campus in Saint Petersburg was founded in 1997. As of 2018, the university in Saint Petersburg ranked third among the socio-economic universities of Russia and second in the city by rating of the average USE admission score of its entrants. As of 2019, the campus has a population of 5500 students and 485 faculty.

Perm
The third regional campus in Perm was also established in 1997. As of 2018, the university had around 2000 students and 120 faculty, and was rated 29th position in the Russian ranking on the quality of enrollment. In 2017, the Bachelor's program "Business informatics" took the fourth position in the same ranking). The campus collaborates with University of Essex and University of Évry Val d'Essonne to offer joint double-degrees with these institutions.

Budget and real estate 
In 2018, the university income amounted to 17.76 billion rubles (as of January 2020 this amounts to approximately 259,405,579 euros). The main sources of financing are state funds, private education services, fundamental and applied research, grants, donations, and others support.

Applied research commissioned by government agencies, private companies or international organizations constitute up to 40% of the university's income. In one academic year, the university completes on average around 300 projects. Other sources of support come from state subsidies and scientific grants, including international programs. For instance, for the Russian Academic Excellence Project alone, the state granted 950 million rubles (as of January 2020, this amounts to approximately 13,874,037 euro).

In 2007, HSE University co-founders established the HSE financial endowment – the nonprofit organization that accepts donations on behalf of the university and invests the received funds. The profit goes to the development of university projects. As of December 2018, the size of the endowment fund was 742.5 million rubles (as of January 2020, this amounts to approximately 10,845,942 euros).

Activity

Education
In 1996, the Higher School of Economics received the status of a State university. Along with the focus on economics, the university emphasized mathematics. By 1999, the Faculty of Law, School of Public Administration, Schools of Political and Social Science had been launched. In 2002, in addition to already existing faculties, the university initiated programs focusing on business and political journalism, psychology, and business informatics.With government support, in 1996–1998 HSE opened new campuses in Russian regions. The first was opened in Nizhny Novgorod, then followed by campuses in Perm and St. Petersburg.

Initially, the university specialized in Economics, Management, and the Social and Human Sciences. However, it later began to focus on Mathematics and Information Technology Programs. In 2017, HSE University launched degrees in Physics and Engineering Sciences, and even announced plans to open experimental laboratories at the institutes of the Russian Academy of Sciences. At the same time, the university launched the program "Data culture" aimed at the gradual implementation of digital literacy courses in all departmental units.

In 1999, HSE University divided the academic year into five modules instead of semesters. However, later, the university administration decided to reduce the number of modules to four. Starting from 1997, most of the exams have taken place in written form, while all the major student works are checked with plagiarism detection software.

Together with the modular system, the university introduced the «major/minor» education system, which means that students take main disciplines as their "major" and choose the block of additional programs subjected to individual choice as "minors". Altogether, this frees up time for students to prepare for seminars and individual projects. Assessment is carried out in accordance with the European Credit Transfer and Accumulation System. Correspondingly, every student has an individual GPA-based ranking that illustrates not only the academic performance, but also affects the size of the scholarship, gives a discount on tuition fees and the opportunity to participate in foreign internships, learn additional languages at the university and much more. Only 8% of students continue education in foreign universities, while 9% of all students came from abroad or participated in exchange programs. The university collaborates with more than 500 partner universities, mainly from Europe and Asia. As for 2019, HSE University had 50 double degree programs with Humboldt University of Berlin, Erasmus University Rotterdam, University of Leeds, London School of Economics, ESCP Europe, and other universities.

Since 2013, the Higher School of Economics has recorded courses for Coursera. According to the platform's official statistics, in 2018, HSE university was in top universities with the most recorded online courses. Altogether, it had posted around 100 courses, 25 of which were in English. As for 2017, HSE had the most recorded courses among all universities in the country. The average number of course participants is around 1 million people, 17% of which are listeners from the United States.

Science and innovations
As of 2018, the university was involved in the work of 37 international laboratories, three of which are located in regional campuses. They were established on the initiative and at the expense of the university as well as "Megagrants" from the government. Among academic supervisors was Nobel Laureate in Economics Eric Maskin (Laboratory of Decision Choice and Analysis), receiver of the Fields Medal Andrei Okounkov and other professors from foreign universities.

Besides research and development, and fundamental and applied research, the university has published the results of 15 large-scale continuously monitored studies, 11 statistics volumes, while additionally supporting national entrepreneurship, and starting from 2000, they have made filings to the Unified Archive of Economic and Sociological Data. According to the UBI Global World, in 2018, the university's business incubator was in the top 7 of world university incubators.

Since 1 February 2017, HSE has been on the list of 23 Russian universities that grant academic degrees. In addition, the university has 16 dissertation councils. As of 2018, HSE University publishes 26 scientific journals, 11 of which are indexed in Scopus, and two in WoS. The average citation index in Scopus increased from 0.5% in 2013 to 6.2% in 2016.

Social projects

In 2013, the HSE campus in Moscow launched the public project "University opened to the city" aimed at conducting a series of lectures, exhibitions, master classes, festivals, and educational activities for citizens. Following the example of the main campus, regional branches have also organized open lecture halls. For instance, in Saint Petersburg, a regular series of lectures takes place on the New Holland Island. In Perm, the HSE campus launched the summer lecture hall.

Other social projects include Master's programs for teachers, development of education standards, expert support for Russian universities, work in associations, and free citizens' consultations on social and judicial questions.

People

Faculty
Initially, HSE applied for grants to invite foreign scholars who, especially at the beginning of the university's history, had more expertise than local specialists. As of 2016, around 11% of the overall number of foreign specialists were professors with a PhD degree.

Due to collaborations with the Ministry of Economic Development, the university invited ministers of economics and politicians to teach classes and give lectures. In the 1990s, the average age of lecturers was 33 years old, by 2011 the number increased to 43 years old. Most of the young scholars came from the Russian Academy of Science and the Moscow State University. HSE has a competitive system for searching for specialists. In the 1990s, due to a generally low salary, most of the professors had several jobs. Thus, HSE University introduced the "effective contract" – a financial system to encourage professors to consider the Higher School of Economics as a primary workplace. Those who have worked at the university for a long time are granted a status of "honoured professor".

Graduates
The Higher School of Economics ranked high in graduate employment rates. In 2016, The Future Today put HSE University with the top Russian universities whose graduates are the most vacant in the market with a 85% employment rate. The survey inside the university also showed that 93% of graduates are employed within the first year after graduation. Some of them take freelance jobs or continue their education.

Among graduates of HSE are Maxim Oreshkin who would later be appointed to the position of Minister of Economic Development of the Russian Federation, and Konstantin Noskov who would become the Minister of Digital Development, Telecommunications and Mass Media of the Russian Federation.

Notes

References
 

 
 
 
 
 
 
 

HSE University
Educational institutions established in 1993
1993 establishments in Russia
Business schools in Russia
National research universities in Russia
Universities in Moscow